Egesheim is a town in the district of Tuttlingen in Baden-Württemberg in Germany.

Geography
The southern branch of the Bära river flows through the town. Approximately two-thirds of the area is forest.

History
The Heidentor is a celtic place of worship. The town is one of the oldest communities in the region, In 770 it is mentioned in a deed of donation of the Abbey of Saint Gall. Various religious and secular lordships have claimed ownership.  In 1381 the village became a domain of Further Austria, and remained so until 1805, when it became part of Württemberg.

Demographics
As of 2011, Egesheim is estimated to have a population of around 643.

External links
Weather in Egesheim
Bike routes in Egesheim
Travel guide to Egesheim

References

Tuttlingen (district)
Württemberg